Sylvanus B. Lowry (July 24, 1824 – 1865) was an American Democratic political boss, newspaper publisher and pioneer in St. Cloud, Minnesota before the American Civil War. He moved there from Kentucky, bringing slaves with him as laborers. He was a profiteer of slavery-related-enterprises. He was elected to the Territorial Council, as the first president of the town council (the office of city mayor did not yet exist), and to the Minnesota State Senate in 1862.

Repeatedly attacked in writing by the abolitionist newspaper publisher Jane Swisshelm, he found his political influence reduced. He started a rival paper The Union, which became the St. Cloud Times. He died young in 1865.

Early life and education
Born in Kentucky, Lowry became a trader and slaveowner. His father was David Lowry, a Scottish-American Cumberland Presbyterian minister and missionary to the Winnebago people in northeast Iowa.

Migration
In 1847, the Lowry family followed the Winnebago as they were forcibly moved to a new Reservation surrounding Long Prairie, Minnesota. Lowry settled in Brockway Township, about 10 miles north of Saint Cloud, along the Mississippi River. He moved into St. Cloud in 1853. His success as a fur trader enabled him to build a large mansion there. His father, a Presbyterian minister who established a Cumberland mission; and his sister Elizabeth and her husband also migrated to St. Cloud by 1854. Lowry took slaves with him as laborers, although the territory residents  had voted to have it be "free" or without slavery. Initially Lowry worked as a trader with Indians for furs, establishing a wide network.

More Southerners entered the state after 1857, when the US Supreme Court ruled in the Dred Scott case that, as slaves were not citizens, they had no standing to file freedom suits. Its decision also that the Missouri Compromise was unconstitutional meant that Minnesota was unable to enforce its laws against slavery. Although the numbers of slaves were not high, several counties around and including St. Cloud had populations of slaves brought by Southerner vacationers before the American Civil War. When the war broke out, most of the Southerners left, taking their slaves with them.

According to historian Christopher Lehman:

Political career
Lowry became active in the Democratic Party in the territory.  He was elected to the Minnesota Territorial Council, serving from 1852 to 1854. the town council voted him council president of the newly incorporated city in 1856.

Active in the state party, Lowry was being groomed to run as Lieutenant Governor. He is well known in Minnesota folklore for his conflict with the abolitionist newspaper publisher Jane Grey Swisshelm, who repeatedly attacked him for his slaveholding as well as mistreatment of the Winnebago people, damaging his political influence. He started a rival paper, The Union, to offset her paper's opinions. ''

Lowry was elected to the Minnesota State Senate in 1862. He died in St. Cloud in 1865.

Notes

1824 births
1865 deaths
People from Kentucky
Mayors of St. Cloud, Minnesota
Members of the Minnesota Territorial Legislature
Democratic Party Minnesota state senators
American political bosses
19th-century American politicians
American people of Scottish descent
People from St. Cloud, Minnesota